Long Lost Suitcase is the 40th studio album released by Welsh singer Tom Jones, released on 9 October 2015. It is the third in a trilogy of albums, following 2010's Praise & Blame and Spirit in the Room in 2012. Like the previous two albums, it was produced by Ethan Johns.

This album comes as a CD in a jewel case with a 16-page booklet featuring rare photos from Jones' career.

Track listing

Reception

Andre Paine, reviewing for the Evening Standard also gave it four stars, stating "At 75, Jones’s volcanic vocal still sounds majestic on an album that maintains the artistic rejuvenation of recent years." Fiona Shepherd in The Scotsman rated it the same. Nathan Bevan, reviewing it for WalesOnline was also positive, while The Guardian's Dave Simpson gave it three stars, calling it "slightly uneven". Paddy Kehoe, for RTÉ, was less enthusiastic, giving it two stars.

Single
The track "Take My Love (I Want To Give It)", originally recorded by Little Willie John in 1961, was released as a single on 6 November 2015.

Personnel
 Tom Jones – vocals
 Ethan Johns - electric & acoustic guitars, organ, clavinet, mellotron, bass, percussion, weissenhorn (1,3-7,9-13)
 Jeremy Stacey – drums (1,3-5,9-13)
 Ian Jennings – double bass (1,3-4)
 Al Gare – double bass (1)
 Leon Mooney – acoustic guitar (2,8)
 Mark McGovern – banjo (2,8)
 Leslie Jones – mandolin (2,8)
 Fiachra Cunningham – violin (2,8)
 Imelda May – vocals (2)
 Andy Fairweather-Low – electric, acoustic & 12-string guitars, backing vocals (3-5,9-13)
 Dave Bronze – bass (5,9-13)

Charts

References

2015 albums
Tom Jones (singer) albums
Albums produced by Ethan Johns